Nicholas Ward may refer to:

Nicholas Ward (MP for Downpatrick) (1630–?), Irish MP for Downpatrick
Nicholas Ward, 2nd Viscount Bangor (1750–1827), Irish MP for Bangor
Nicholas Ward (boxer) (1811–1850), English bare-knuckle fighter
Nicholas Ward, English violinist and musical director of the Northern Chamber Orchestra 1985–2022

See also
Nick Ward (disambiguation)